The Bread and Alley (Nān o Kūcheh) is a 1970 Iranian short film directed and written by Abbas Kiarostami. The ten-minute film was the first film directed by Kiarostami.

Shot in black and white, the film tells the story of a little boy walking home with a loaf of bread who is confronted by a hungry dog, placing his safety at risk.

Plot
Returning from an errand to buy bread, a boy finds a menacing dog blocking his way through the alley he must pass to get home. Frightened by the dog's barking, he asks various passers-by for help but no-one pays him any attention, and he must find a solution all by himself: he throws the dog a piece of bread and, while the animal is devouring it, he continues on his way home.
when the boy with the bread finds the way to treat the dog, then there is another boy with the bowl of yogurt encounters the same dog that is barking. The solution which is worked for the first boy cannot be applied for the second boy. This is how Kiarostami shows the unique experience of each person.

See also
List of Iranian films

External links

1970 films
Iranian short films
Iranian black-and-white films
Films directed by Abbas Kiarostami
Films set in Iran
Persian-language films